Hrušta is a village in the municipality of Nevesinje, Republika Srpska and for a small part also in the City of Mostar, Bosnia and Herzegovina.

Demographics 
According to the 2013 census, its population was 158, all Bosniaks living in the Nevesinje municipality and none in the Mostar municipality.

References

Populated places in Nevesinje
Populated places in Mostar
Villages in Republika Srpska